Haydock is a surname. Notable people with the surname include:

Billy Haydock, English footballer
Christopher Haydock, English politician
Cuthbert Haydock (1684–1763), Catholic recusant priest
Eric Haydock (1943–2019), English bassist, original member of the band The Hollies
George Haydock (1556–1584), Catholic recusant priest and martyr 
George Leo Haydock (1774–1849), Catholic recusant priest and Bible scholar 
James Haydock (1764?–1809), Catholic recusant priest
Jimmy Haydock (1872–1900), English footballer
Margaret Haydock (1767?–1854), Catholic recusant nun
Thomas Haydock(1772–1859), Catholic recusant publisher
Tom Haydock (disambiguation), multiple people